The Herritarren Zerrenda (HZ,) is a Basque nationalist political party in Spain and France, created in 2004 to run in the European Parliament election. Since these elections were simultaneous throughout the European Union, and states were represented as single constituencies, Herritarren Zerrenda aspired for results at the national level in both countries.

HZ aspired to group and represent the Abertzale Left, including the outlawed Batasuna (as Autodeterminaziorako Bilgunea had done a year before). In France they ran on a single list with Batasuna (as the party is not illegal north of the border) - a fact which did not constitute a violation of the Spanish laws.

In Spain, HZ counted on obtaining seats in Strasbourg (as Batasuna and its coalition Euskal Herritarrok had previously done). The possibility was slimmer in France, due to the small percentage of Basques of Iparralde in the country as a whole, as well as to the reduced support for Batasuna.

In the end, HZ called for a blank vote, and its voters cast ballots valid only in the French constituency. The group dissolved after the elections.

2004 establishments in Spain
Political parties in the Basque Country (autonomous community)
Banned secessionist parties
Banned socialist parties
Basque nationalism
Left-wing nationalist parties
Nationalist parties in Spain
Political parties established in 2004
Political parties in Northern Basque Country
Pro-independence parties
Socialist parties in the Basque Country (autonomous community)
Transnational political parties
Banned political parties in the Basque Country (autonomous community)